Niklas Brandt (born 22 November 1991) is a German footballer who plays as a defensive midfielder for BFC Dynamo.

Career 
On 11 May 2016, he extended his contract with 1. FC Magdeburg until 2017.

References

External links 
 
 

1989 births
Living people
German footballers
Association football midfielders
3. Liga players
Regionalliga players
Berliner AK 07 players
Hallescher FC players
1. FC Magdeburg players
FC Viktoria 1889 Berlin players
Berliner FC Dynamo players
1. FC Lokomotive Leipzig players
Footballers from Berlin